The Milan–Monza railway line is the second oldest railway in Italy.

In November 1839 the Austrian Emperor Ferdinand I of Austria authorized construction of the railroad by the Holzhammer Company, owned by the aristocrat Giovanni Putzer. Planning was by the Italian engineer Giulio Sarti. In one year the railway was built with two stations, the Porta Nuova Station in Milan and the Monza Station. It had rails mounted on large cubic stone sunk into the ground and gauge was maintained from time to time with transverse bars. The line was opened for service on 18 August 1840.  The line was straight and the movement of trains was supervised by signalmen in high masonry towers along the line who communicated the movement of trains with optical and acoustic signals.

Trains operated four return trips each day—which was soon increased to six—with a time of about 20 minutes. The railway equipment included three English steam locomotives built by George Rennie and Robert Stephenson, named Lombardia, Milano and Lambro, and 21 passenger cars. The terminal stations were at Porta Nuova in Milan and Monza and there was an intermediate station at Sesto San Giovanni. By the end of 1840, 150,000 passengers had been carried. The original station was replaced by a new station nearby also called Porta Nuova in 1850, which was in turn replaced by a new through station called Milano Centrale in 1864. The original Milano Centrale station was replaced by the modern terminal station of Milano Centrale in 1931. However, most passenger trains have been routed to Milano Porta Garibaldi (opened in 1963 near the old Porta Nuova stations) since the opening of a tunnel connecting it with the Monza line in 1966.

The line now forms part of the Milan–Chiasso line; the line to Lecco connects Monza to the Valtellina region.

References

Railway lines in Lombardy
Railway lines opened in 1840
Railway companies established in 1839
1839 establishments in the Austrian Empire